"Gin & Juice" is a song by American musical artist DeVante, one of the founding members of  R&B group Jodeci, featuring a guest rap performance from Static. The song was released as the fourth single for the soundtrack to the 1995 film Dangerous Minds in August 1995. The single was a promotional only release and not released for sale.

Track listings
12", Vinyl
"Gin & Juice (Remix Version) – 4:39(feat. Da' Boogie Man, Mr. Brendal, Playa, Timbaland & Magoo)
"Gin & Juice (LP Version) – 5:06
"Gin & Juice (Clean Radio) – 4:09
"Gin & Juice (Instrumental) – 5:05

Notes

External links

1996 singles
MCA Records singles
Song recordings produced by DeVante Swing
Songs written by DeVante Swing
1995 songs